Kusheh (also Romanized as Kūsheh) is a village in Barkuh Rural District, Kuhsorkh County, Razavi Khorasan Province, Iran. At the 2006 census, its population was 1,113, in 278 families.

References 

Populated places in Kuhsorkh County